Peking Univ. East Gate station is a station on Line 4 of the Beijing Subway. The station is located just outside the east gate of Peking University, at the intersection of Chengfu Road and Zhongguancun North Street.

Station layout 
The station has an underground island platform.

Exits 
There are 4 exits, lettered A, B, C, and D. Exit D is accessible.

Gallery

References

External links
 

Beijing Subway stations in Haidian District
Railway stations in China opened in 2009
Railway stations in China at university and college campuses